King Jack is a 2015 American coming-of-age adventure drama film written and directed by Felix Thompson in his directorial debut. The film stars Charlie Plummer, Cory Nichols, Christian Madsen, Daniel Flaherty, Erin Davie and Chloe Levine, and follows a 15-year-old boy who befriends his introverted cousin while facing off against a sadistic school bully.

Plot
Jack, a scrappy 15-year-old boy, bonds with his introverted cousin while facing off against a bully.

Cast
 Charlie Plummer as Jack
 Cory Nichols as Ben
 Christian Madsen as Tom
 Daniel Flaherty as Shane
 Erin Davie as Karen
 Chloe Levine as Holly
 Yainis Ynoa as Harriet
 Melvin Mogoli as Beavan
 Keith Leonard as Officer Pete
 Francis Piscopo as Eric

Release
The film premiered at the Tribeca Film Festival on April 17, 2015.

Reception
On the review aggregator website Rotten Tomatoes, which categorizes reviews only as positive or negative, 94% of 35 reviews are positive. The website's critical consensus reads, "Hard-hitting and honest yet sensitive, King Jack is an uncommonly affecting coming-of-age drama and a powerful calling card for debuting writer-director Felix Thompson." On Metacritic, which uses a weighted average, assigned the film a score of 72 out of 100 based on 17 critics, indicating "Generally Favorable Reviews".

In the Los Angeles Times, Michael Rechtsaffen said that "thanks to a strongly rooted lead performance by Charlie Plummer as a 15-year-old small-town kid who's well on his way to a stint in juvenile detention, "King Jack" still strikes a resonant chord." On IndieWire, David Ehrlich said that "writer-director Felix Thompson's first film is a sensitive and self-possessed debut that clocks in at 76 minutes and doesn't waste a single one of them"

References

External links
 Official website (archive)
 

2015 films
2010s adventure drama films
American adventure drama films
American coming-of-age drama films
2010s coming-of-age drama films
American independent films
Films about bullying
Films about children
Films set in New York (state)
Films set in 2010
Films shot in New York (state)
Whitewater Films films
2015 independent films
2015 directorial debut films
2015 drama films
2010s English-language films
2010s American films